Events in the year 2011 in Mozambique.

Incumbents
President: Armando Guebuza
Prime Minister: Aires Ali

Events
 Mozambique's corn production dramatically dropped

Arts and entertainment
The first showing of Pinocchio in Mozambique was shown in the Camblo Del Oro Theatre.

Sports
Mozambique hosted the 2011 All-Africa Games from September 3 to September 18.

Deaths
 January 5 - Malangatana Ngwenya, painter

References

 
Years of the 21st century in Mozambique
Mozambique
2010s in Mozambique
Mozambique